Village Christian School is a private Christian school established in 1994 by Dwight and Kitty Hesson. It is located on the property owned and operated under the auspices of Mid-Western Children’s Home.

History 
The school is chartered by the Ohio Department of Education and is accredited to give high school diplomas to every student who successfully completes the requirements for graduation from the 12th grade. The school serves students 7th through 12th grade. Students receive instruction in core courses, plus electives such as health, home economics, speech and cultural research.

Mid-Western Children’s Home shares its 167 acre campus with VILLAGE.  The complex includes 2 basketball gymnasiums, baseball and soccer fields, a campground, an 18 hole golf course, and a 14 acre lake.

Academics 
The school is staffed by a 100% highly qualified faculty. Students also receive therapeutic services including group and individual counseling, family counseling, community support and home bound services.

VILLAGE provides its students with the latest in technology available with its computer lab and classrooms.  They also have a home economics lab that is utilized for life skills development.

External links
VILLAGE Christian School
Mid-Western Children's Home

Christian schools in Ohio
Private high schools in Ohio